Srinivasa "Arjun" Sarja is an Indian actor, producer, and director who works predominantly in the Tamil film industry, in addition to Kannada and Telugu languages and few Malayalam and Hindi flims. Referred to by the media and his fans as "Action King" for his roles in action films, Arjun has acted in more than 160 films, most of them being lead roles. He is one of few South Indian actors to attract fan following from multiple states of India. He has directed 12 films and also produced and distributed a number of films.

In 1993, he starred in S. Shankar's blockbuster Gentleman which opened to positive reviews, while Arjun went on to win the Tamil Nadu State Film Award for Best Actor. During this time, he starred in hits such as Jai Hind (1994), Karnaa (1995), and the action thriller film Kurudhipunal (1995), for which Arjun won acclaim for his role while the film became India's official entry for the 68th Academy Awards in the Best Foreign Language Film category. In 1999, he starred in the political action-thriller, Mudhalvan (1999), which earned him the Tamil Nadu State Film Award for Best Actor for his role as well as numerous other nominations. He was then featured in Vasanth's romantic drama film Rhythm, where he played a photographer, who eventually falls in love with a widow. Featuring a popular soundtrack and opening to positive reviews, Rhythm also became a commercial success.

Arjun made appearances in the bilingual film Sri Manjunatha (2001) and the Telugu film Hanuman Junction (2001). In 2012, he appeared in the Kannada film Prasad, which screened at the Berlin Film Festival. He won the Karnataka State Film Award for Best Actor for his work in the film. The multilingual film Abhimanyu (2014) won the Karnataka State Film Award for Second Best Film.

Personal life
Sarja was born to actor Shakti Prasad, and his mother was Lakshmi, an art teacher. He had one elder brother Kishore Sarja, who directed Kannada films. Arjun had always thought and dreamt of becoming a police officer but his fate took him into an entirely different direction.

Arjun is an ardent devotee of Hanuman. He is building the Hanuman temple at the outskirts of Chennai. A 35-foot statue of the Lord Anjaneya was sculpted exclusively for the temple and the statue of the Hanuman is in a sitting posture and weighs around 140 tonnes. The sitting posture of the Hanuman statue is first of its kind in India. The single-stone statue is in 35 feet high and 12 feet wide and 7 feet thick.

His nephews Chiranjeevi Sarja and Dhruva Sarja have acted in Kannada movies. Another nephew of Arjun, Bharat Sarja, made his acting debut in 2014. Sarja, inspired by Bruce Lee's 1973 film Enter the Dragon, began training Karate at the age of 16 and now holds a black belt.

He is married to Niveditha Arjun in 1988, a former actress who has appeared in the 1986 Kannada film Ratha Sapthami under the stage name of Asha Rani. Kannada actor Rajesh is his father-in-law. Sarja has two daughters, Aishwarya and Anjana. Aishwarya Arjun made her acting debut in 2013.

Acting career

1981-1991: Early career and breakthrough
Arjun's father Shakti Prasad, a renowned actor of Kannada films, did not want his son to become an actor and turned down film offers that Arjun began to receive as a teenager. In a surprise move, film producer Rajendra Singh Babu managed to convince Arjun to begin shooting for a feature film for his production house without Shakti Prasad's express permission and consequently, his father agreed to Arjun's career choice. The film Simhada Mari Sainya (1981) featured him as a junior artiste and the director of the film gave him the stage name of Arjun, replacing his original name Ashok Babu. While he began to establish himself Kannada films, he received an offer from actor-producer A. V. M. Rajan and director Rama Narayanan to do a Tamil film Nandri (1984). Simultaneously he was offered a Telugu film, Kodi Ramakrishna's Maa Pallelo Gopaludu (1985) in Telugu too which went on to be a big success, running for a year in three centers.

His career as an actor began to take off in the mid-1980s and he sometimes worked for up to seven shifts in a day to keep up with the films he had committed to do. In Telugu, he established himself as a bankable actor with roles in films such as Naga Devatha (1986) and Manavadostunnadu (1987). In Tamil, his successful films during the period included Shankar Guru (1987), Thaimel Aanai (1988), Vettaiyaadu Vilaiyaadu (1989) and Sonthakkaran (1989). By 1990, his films lost box office value and he was out of work in Tamil and Telugu films for almost a year.

1992-2001: Commercial success and critical acclaim
In 1992, he subsequently chose to direct his feature film Sevagan. Soon after, Shankar cast him in the lead role in his first film, Gentleman (1993), after much persuasion. Arjun had initially rejected the film without listening to Shankar's narration but the director's persistence prompted him to feature in the film as a vigilante against corruption. The film opened to positive reviews and went on to become a trendsetter in the Tamil film industry, as well as achieving significant box office success, while Arjun went on to win the State Award for Best Actor. His change of fortune at the box office continued and Arjun began to gain ground as a bankable lead star in action films after his films including his patriotic directorial venture Jai Hind (1994) and Karnaa (1995), where he played a dual role, went on to become blockbusters. Kamal Haasan approached Arjun to play a police officer in the action thriller film Kurudhipunal (1995), and the actor accepted the opportunity and agreed to do the film even without hearing the narration. Arjun won positive acclaim for his role, while the film became India's official entry for the 68th Academy Awards Best Foreign Language Film category.

In the late 1990s, after a series of action films, including Sengottai (1996) and Thaayin Manikodi (1998), he teamed up again with Shankar in the political drama film Mudhalvan (1999). Portraying an ambitious TV journalist who receives the opportunity to become the Chief Minister of Tamil Nadu for a day, Arjun offered bulk dates for filming the project to Shankar. The film subsequently won positive reviews with Arjun described as having "acquitted himself with aplomb in the challenging role". Arjun received the Tamil Nadu State Film Award for Best Actor for his role as well as numerous other nominations.

Arjun then briefly experimented in softer roles, portraying critically acclaimed characters of businessman with "shades of grey" in Prabhu Solomon's Kannodu Kanbathellam (1999) and as an energetic civil service officer in Vaanavil (2000). He then featured in Vasanth's romantic drama film Rhythm (2000), where he played a photographer, who eventually falls in love with another widower. Featuring a popular soundtrack and opening to positive reviews, Rhythm also became a commercial success, with a critic noting "Arjun is as polished as ever" and adding "who would have conceived this idea that the "action king" could attempt a soft-natured role of this kind". He carried on with a lighter theme in his next directorial venture, the love story Vedham (2001), while he ventured into Telugu cinema again by appearing in Raja's Hanuman Junction and as a Hindu devotee in Sri Manjunatha (2001).

2002-2010: Action roles and experimentation 
The image of "action king" made him popular with town and village centre audiences, who appreciated the actor's fight and stunt scenes. He thus actively chose to specialise in action films, often collaborating with directors who specialised in them such as Sundar C, Venkatesh and Selva. In the mid-2000s, he appeared in several action films with the same premise, often portraying a police officer or a local do-gooder. He directed and featured  in both the action films Ezhumalai (2002) and Parasuram (2003), while also being involved in Maharajan's Arasatchi (2004). Some of his films, Giri (2004) and Marudhamalai (2007), were box office successes, with several of his projects were not, including Madrasi (2006), Vathiyar (2006) and Durai (2008), in all of which he was the story writer.

Despite not achieving any significant hit films in the 2000s, producers often considered Arjun as a "minimum guarantee" actor and felt his sizable fan following the four Southern States of India would help recover money even through dubbed versions. In a rare experimental film for him in the decade, he portrayed the role of the Hindu deity Hanuman in Krishna Vamsi's devotional film Sri Anjaneyam (2004) and worked on the film without receiving remuneration as a self-confessed worshipper of the deity.

2011-present: Character roles and recent projects 
Since the turn of the decade, Arjun has attempted to move away from his "action king" image and accepted to star in films where he would play the antagonist or a supporting role, with the move drawing praise from film critics. In 2011, Arjun accepted the opportunity to act alongside Ajith Kumar in Venkat Prabhu's action thriller Mankatha, with critics praising his performance as a police officer in the blockbuster. The following year he appeared in Kannada film Prasad, for which he won the Karnataka State Film Award for Best Actor. Portraying a middle-class father with a deaf and dumb son, Arjun noted it was a rewarding experience for him to break the monotony of his standard roles and attempt something different, admitting he was moved by the script. The film opened to unanimously positive reviews in March 2012 and then was selected to be screened at the Berlin Film Festival, with critics labelling Arjun's portrayal as a "stunning performance" and his "career-best".

Arjun collaborated with Mani Ratnam with Kadal (2013), in which the actor portrayed a negative role of a smuggler in coastal Tamil Nadu. While the film opened to mixed reviews and became a box office failure, Arjun won rave reviews for his portrayal with Sify.com noting Arjun is "deliciously despicable in his career's most memorable negative role" and The Hindu labelling him as "brilliant". He then won acclaim for his portrayal of a real-life police officer K. Vijay Kumar in the Kannada film Attahasa (2013), the biopic of notorious forest brigand Veerappan, as well as for his role of a paralysed swimming coach in Vasanth's romance film, Moondru Per Moondru Kadal (2013).

His directorial venture, Jai Hind 2 (2014) contained a message about the declining state of the Indian education system. The film became a box office success in Kannada, while the Tamil and Telugu versions did not perform well at the box office. In 2016, he played a realistic police officer in Bharathiraja's critically acclaimed Final Cut of Director (dubbed in Tamil as Bommalattam), where a reviewer felt his "showcase of the soft, subtle yet unrelenting cop was noteworthy". In 2017, he appeared in his 150th film Nibunan, an action thriller where he played a police officer hunting a serial killer. The film won positive reviews, with a critic noting that Arjun "looks stylish and suave as the fit and honest officer, and excels in a couple of action blocks he gets". He then directed a bilingual film titled Prema Baraha (2018) starring his daughter Aishwarya Arjun in the leading role While, the Kannada version performed well, the Tamil version, Sollividava, went unnoticed at the box office. He starred in the Telugu films Lie (2017) and Naa Peru Surya, Naa Illu India (2018). Irumbu Thirai (2018) showed a different Arjun to the audience. Kolaigaran (2019) was also a performance-oriented film. Arjun Sarja's performance as Karna is another highlight of the movie Kurukshetra (2019).

Filmography

Awards
 1993 – Tamil Nadu State Film Award for Best Actor for Gentleman
 1999 – Tamil Nadu State Film Award for Best Actor for Mudhalvan
 2011 – Silver Screen Sensational Actor Award
 2012 – Karnataka State Film Award for Best Actor for Prasad
 2013 – Vijay Award for Best Villain – Kadal
 2014 – Karnataka State Film Award for Second Best Film for Abhimanyu
 2019 – Norway Tamil Film Festival Award for Best Supporting Actor – Hero

Allegations
In October 2018, as part of the ＃MeToo movement, actress Shruthi Hariharan accused Arjun Sarja of misconduct, in November 2015, on the set of the 2016 film Vismaya (Nibunan in Tamil), where she was portraying Arjun Sarja's wife. After her allegations, Arjun Sarja completely denied her allegations and filed Rs 5 crore defamation suit against Sruthi Hariharan.

After Arjun's defamation case was filed, Sruthi Hariharan filed a sexual harassment case with the police with a new set of stories. The Bangalore Police immediately investigated this case and they submitted their report also. In their report, they said there was "no evidence" in favor of her.

In this investigation, All crew members of this film said there was no such incident that happened on the sets and director Arun Vaidyanathan who was named as the eye-witness in the case, said Arjun Sarja is a nice person. He said The romantic scene script was already finalized before the shooting. According to the director, Arjun Sarja had asked the filmmaker to reduce the romantic scenes in the movie. He had also said that Arjun Sarja and Sruthi Hariharan are good friends and he never noticed Arjun Sarja misbehaving with Sruthi on the sets.

Arjun's defamation case against her is still pending at the Bengaluru City Civil Court.

References

Sources

External links

 
 Arjun Sarja on Filmibeat.com

Male actors in Tamil cinema
Indian male film actors
Male actors in Kannada cinema
Male actors in Telugu cinema
Indian Hindus
Male actors from Mysore
People from Tumkur district
Living people
Tamil film directors
Kannada film directors
Telugu film directors
Tamil film producers
Kannada film producers
Telugu film producers
Tamil playback singers
Telugu playback singers
Indian male playback singers
Tamil Nadu State Film Awards winners
21st-century Indian film directors
20th-century Indian film directors
Film producers from Karnataka
20th-century Indian singers
Film directors from Karnataka
Screenwriters from Karnataka
20th-century Indian dramatists and playwrights
21st-century Indian dramatists and playwrights
21st-century Indian singers
Indian film distributors
20th-century Indian male singers
21st-century Indian male singers
Year of birth missing (living people)